The Markham Pan Am Centre is a multi-purpose community and aquatics centre located in the new downtown area of Markham, Ontario, Canada.

The facility was designed to host the badminton, table tennis and water polo events for the 2015 Pan American Games, held in nearby Toronto in July and August, 2015.  The venue also hosted the table tennis competition in the 2015 Parapan American Games. During the Pan Am and Parapan American Games the venue was known as the Atos Markham Pan Am / Parapan American Centre. After the 2015 Pan Am Games, the facility continues to be used as a community and competition centre for aquatics, badminton, volleyball, basketball and table tennis for Markham-area residents.

Design
The 13,657 square metre (147,000 sq. foot) multipurpose centre comprises three gymnasiums for training, competition and community use as well as a 10-lane, 50-metre Olympic-size swimming pool.  The building became the first venue to be constructed for the 2015 Pan American Games to have its design unveiled and the official ground breaking for the facility was on October 9, 2012. The facility cost roughly $78 million Canadian dollars to be built and had its official opening on November 23, 2014.

The building's triple gymnasium features 12 badminton courts, 6 volleyball, 2 basketball courts, and a 12.5-metre-high (41 ft.) ceiling that meets international BWF and FIVB requirements for height in badminton and volleyball. The warm-up hall adjacent to the main gymnasium features 3 badminton courts, 1 volleyball and 1 basketball court.

The 50-metre pool was designed to meet FINA international and Olympic competition standards, and includes two movable bulkheads (walls) to section the pool into three zones, and permanent seating for 2,000 spectators. Other features include rooms for dance, yoga, and a two-level fitness centre.

Major competitions hosted

Badminton

Table Tennis

Water Polo

Swimming

Floorball

 World Floorball qualifications, 2014

See also
Venues of the 2015 Pan American and Parapan American Games
York University - future Markham Campus will be located directly on the west side of the Pan Am Centre

References

External links

 web site of Markham Pan Am Centre
 Toronto 2015 Atos Markham Pan Am / Parapan Am Centre Page
 City of Markham Pan Am Centre page

Badminton venues
Buildings and structures in Markham, Ontario
Water polo venues
Sport in Markham, Ontario
Badminton in Canada
Venues of the 2015 Pan American Games
Venues of the 2015 Parapan American Games
2014 establishments in Ontario
Sports venues completed in 2014
Public–private partnership projects in Canada